The Yerinat is a stream in Khakassia, Russia. It is a left tributary of the Bolshoy Abakan. It is nearby to Khrebet Korbu and Gora Azhu-Tayga mountains.

Localities in the area 
 Khrebet Korbu Mountain, 22 km northwest
 Gora Azhu-Tayga Mountain, 26 km northeast
 Gora Tuzhu Mountain, 35 km west
 Gora Baskon Mountain, 42 km west

References

Rivers of Khakassia